South Australian Pidgin English is an English-based pidgin contact language used between European settlers and Australian aborigines. It began some time around or before 1820 on Kangaroo Island, a sealing and whaling base, between the sealers and whalers and their aboriginal 'wives', who were abducted from Tasmania or the Adelaide Plains. It likely developed from or was at least influenced by Nautical Jargon and New South Wales Pidgin English. The center of the language shifted to Adelaide when South Australia was established in 1836, and was the contact medium between the colonists and the Kaurna people, which at first was a relatively equitable relationship. The earliest written records of the language date from this period. The influence of NSW Pidgin continued. SAPE spread north, through Alice Springs and as far north as Darwin, starting in the 1860s. Terms from northern languages enter it at this time, but it retains its NSWPE core (Foster et al. 2003 p. xii). It seems to have stabilized by the 1890s. Traces of it remain in northern Cattle Station English and southern Nunga English, as well as a number of other varieties of Australian Aboriginal English.

References

English-based pidgins and creoles of Australia
Languages attested from the 1830s